The MTV VJ Hunt is a search conducted by certain MTV channels in Asia for their respective channels' newest VJs.

Indonesia

MTV VJ Hunt Indonesia in 2014 was the last VJ Hunt competition in the country as the MTV license for Indonesia was cut because of economic reasons  (albeit MTV Indonesia is closed first in 2012 because of some undisclosed reasons.). In MTV VJ Hunt Indonesia 2011, Haries Argareza (Arga) Harahap was chosen as the runner up and Andra Ziggie got the 3rd place.

Philippines
The MTV VJ Hunt in the Philippines was held every two years, and has produced notable Filipino VJs. During the 2005 MTV VJ Hunt, instead of choosing the standard two winners, four winners were picked for the first time. One winner, Colby Miller became the first Philippine VJ Hunt winner to be hired by MTV Asia. During the whole duration of MTV Philippines, KC Montero became the longest active VJ Hunt winner.

1997
 Shannen Torres (1997–2000)
 Jamie Wilson (1997-1998)

1999
 KC Montero (1999–2007)
 Belinda Panelo (1999–2003)

2001
 Derek Ramsay (2001-2002)
 Anna Shier (2001–2003)

2003
 Patty Laurel (2003–2004)
 Johan Ekedum (2003)

2005
 Colby Miller (2005–2007)
 Nicole Fonacier (2005–2006)
 Claire Olivar (2005-2006)
 Don Puno (2005)

2007
 Kat Alano (2007-2009)
 Andi Manzano (2007–2009)
 Sib Sibulo (2007–2009)

Vietnam

The first season of the search for a VJ on MTV Vietnam begins from July 15, 2012. Utt Panichkul (from MTV Asia) and former model Thúy Hạnh (from Vietnam) are the permanent judging members. They are joined hands by Holly Grabarek (MTV Asia), Thanh Bạch, music producer Huy Tuấn, Nguyễn Hải Phong, actress Ngọc Hiệp, actress Lê Khánh, and fashion designer Công Trí throughout 12 weeks.

References

External links
 https://web.archive.org/web/20091121022338/http://www.mtvindia.com/vjhunt/
 https://archive.today/20130421192540/http://vjcamp.mtvvietnam.com.vn/

MTV